GOR C-Tra Arena is a multifunction sport arena in Bandung, Indonesia. This arena is home for JNE Siliwangi  from Indonesian Basketball League. This arena can be used as basketball, volleyball, or futsal venues.

References

Basketball venues in Indonesia